James Anderson (July 13, 1921 – September 14, 1969), sometimes billed as Kyle James, was an American television and film actor of the 1950s and 1960s. He is probably best known for his role as Bob E. Lee Ewell in To Kill a Mockingbird (1962).

Career
He made more than 120 appearances, mostly in television and several films between 1941 and 1969. He made three guest appearances on Perry Mason, including the role of murder victim Frank Anderson in the 1958 episode, "The Case of the Pint-Sized Client," and murder victim Stanley Piper in the 1960 episode, "The Case of the Ill-Fated Faker." He appeared in a number of westerns throughout his career, often playing a gun-for-hire or outlaw...including "Sanctuary at Crystal Springs", the controversial 1963 episode of the ABC/Warner Brothers western series The Dakotas, that led to the series' cancellation, where he played the main antagonist.. He also appeared on Gunsmoke in 1963, playing outlaw named “Harmon” in S12E7’s “The Wrong Man”.  That same year he guest starred on Alfred Hitchcock Presents in the 1963 episode “Last Seen Wearing Blue Jeans” (S1E28).

Personal life
 
His actress sister, Mary Anderson, died in 2014 at the age of 96. They appeared in one film together, 1951's Hunt the Man Down.

Death
He died of a heart attack at the age of 48. His final two films — The Ballad of Cable Hogue (1969) and Little Big Man (1970) — were released posthumously.

Filmography

References

External links
 
 
 Jim Anderson entry at Bustersoft blog

Male actors from Alabama
American male television actors
1921 births
1969 deaths
People from Wetumpka, Alabama
American male film actors
20th-century American male actors
Male Western (genre) film actors